Masque of the Red Death is a campaign setting for the Dungeons & Dragons role-playing game, named after the Edgar Allan Poe short story of the same name. The setting was published after the release of the Ravenloft campaign setting in 1994 as Masque of the Red Death and Other Tales, and is regarded as an add-on for that line.  Masque of the Red Death has many of the same qualities as Ravenloft, such as "power checks" and restricted magic, including limited planar travel. Unlike Ravenloft, the location of the adventures is Gothic Earth, an 1890s version of Earth where fantasy creatures exist only in the shadows of civilization. Many notable real-life figures or 19th century literary characters are included for the players to interact with, including Van Helsing, Jack the Ripper and Dorian Gray.

In 2004, White Wolf Games released a D20 System version of the setting in hardback under the Sword and Sorcery imprint.

Classes
In the 3.5 Living Death RPGA Campaign Sourcebook, players can choose from a large list of classes that represent the many different kinds of people and professions that can exist in an 1800s Earth:

Adept - spellcasters, equivalent of D&D wizards in Masque of the Red Death.

Athlete - players can choose a specific sport (golf, hockey, football, American football, etc.) and gain bonus feats depending on the sport they choose. This class has many acrobatic and survival skills.

Charlatan - spellcasters, equivalent of D&D sorcerers in Masque of the Red Death, this class also has many rogue skills to choose from.

Cowboy - the cowboy receives a d10 for its hit dice. A cowboy also has many good survival and outdoor skills, much like a ranger. Cowboys are proficient in guns and receive skills in gunsmithing and repair.

Criminal - This class is an almost exact copy of the rogue, excluding the new class skills it gains that are introduced in Masque of the Red Death. If players do not begin as Criminals, they cannot multi-class and gain Criminal levels unless the DM grants special permission.

Dandy - Dandies represent members of the upper class and high society. They receive many skills that involve influence and behavior. This class also receives the "Influence" ability which allows them to make use of their resources and contacts at DM discretion. Dandies also receive one of the highest salaries in the game.

Detective - The detective gains attack bonuses and saves like the rogue, but receives a d8 for hit dice. The Detective has many skills with influence and searching. They also receive the "Influence" ability, but it is limited to police connections and can only be used once a month.

Diletante - Diletantes are members of the rich and high society who enjoy spending their fortunes seeking 'thrills' of the occult nature. Diletantes can cast spells with 'Spiritcraft', which works similarly to divine spells in D&D. Diletantes gain a -2 penalty to Spot, Search and Initiative rolls that increases by another -2 every 5 levels. Diletantes can turn undead as clerics, following the special turning rules of Masque of Death.

Explorer - the equivalent of D&D rangers in Masque of the Red Death. Explorers gain many skills involving survival and travel. Explorers gain the "Track" and Wild Empathy feats as the ranger. Explorers receive a -4 penalty to all Bluff, Diplomacy, Disguise, Etiquette, and Gather Information checks with people in metropolitan areas.

Wealth
Each class has a certain amount of cash they receive at the beginning of the game, instead of using normal 3.5 treasure rules. At the beginning of each adventure, or DM discretion, players earn their salaries. Salaries are dependent on a salary chart. Each class gains anywhere from 1-6 d6 dice for salary. Then, by taking the combined score of the players Wisdom and Charisma and dividing that total by 2, and taking the amount of d6s their class earns, they apply these to the chart and find their characters salary.

Spells
Spells of the Masque of Red Death are much more difficult for players to use and learn. All spell casting classes can only gain spells normally their first level. Any further spells must be learned through scrolls or tomes found or given by the DM as reward. A spellcraft or spiritcraft check must be made to see if the spell is successfully learned. In addition, a majority of spells have a vast increase in casting time to further weaken player spell casting. Players must also roll a d100 every time a spell is cast to check if they gain any corruption. The chance of corruption gain varies from spell level and power. If a player gains corruption, they can suffer ill effects like paranoia, madness, lesions, bad eyesight, etc. Spells pertaining to undead and necromancy are far more potent in Masque of the Red Death. This makes it far more difficult for players to maintain control over these spells and much easier for players to gain corruption from them.

The Red Death
The Red Death is a mysterious evil energy that can manipulate the world. Its very origins are unknown to anyone, but many theories abound. Some say it is very much like a physical red mist, while others claim it to be a universal force like gravity.

What is known is the effects that the Red Death has. It is capable of raising undead, transforming people into monsters, driving people insane, moving whole areas and locations, and affecting the very fabric of reality. The Red Death is an extremely powerful force that comes and goes at its own whim, and is the source of all evil in the Masque of The Red Death world.

Adventures
An adventure titled Jigsaw appeared in Dungeon #61 (Sep/Oct 1996). The plot concerns a golem (a Frankenstein's Monster like creation) named Udo who wants to marry Victoria Von Lendstein, his creator. She is engaged to another man, and he would rather see her dead. The players must protect Victoria from her creation.

An adventure titled Dark Magic in New Orleans appeared in Dungeon #71 (Nov/Dec 1998). The plot concerns the machinations of Voodoo King Doctor John and Voodoo Queen Marie Laveau in 1890s New Orleans. The players must discover who is behind a series of murders in old New Orleans, while avoiding their own deaths.

See also
The Gothic Earth Gazetteer

References

External links
http://www.rpg.net/news+reviews/reviews/rev_3550.html
http://www.rpg.net/news+reviews/reviews/rev_375.html
Downloaded for Fraternity of Shadows modern update of the setting

Dungeons & Dragons campaign settings
Ravenloft
Works based on The Masque of the Red Death